Vernon Charles Kay (born 28 April 1974) is an English television and radio presenter, and former model. He presented Channel 4's T4 (2000–2005) and has presented various television shows for ITV, including All Star Family Fortunes (2006–2015), Just the Two of Us (2006–2007), Beat the Star (2008–2009), The Whole 19 Yards (2010), Splash! (2013–2014), and 1000 Heartbeats (2015–2016).

Kay presented his own BBC Radio 1 show between 2004 and 2012, and presented his own show on Radio X between 2015 and 2017. Since the start of the 2018–19 season, he has been the main presenter for the live coverage of Formula E for English speaking territories/platforms around the world.

In 2020, Kay appeared on the twentieth series of I'm a Celebrity...Get Me Out of Here!, finishing in third place, behind Jordan North and the eventual Queen of the Castle, Giovanna Fletcher.

In 2023, Kay was announced as the new mid morning host on BBC Radio 2 from May 2023, taking over the slot from Ken Bruce.

Early life
Vernon Charles Kay was born on 28 April 1974 and was brought up in Bolton, Greater Manchester, the elder son of Norman, a lorry driver, and Gladys; he has a younger brother, Stephen, a primary school teacher. He attended St Joseph's RC High School in Horwich, near Bolton and then spent two years of his life at St John Rigby College, Gathurst Road, Orrell. He then graduated in environmental science at Manchester Metropolitan University.  

Vernon supports his hometown's football club Bolton Wanderers.

Career

Modelling
While Vernon was working in a DIY shop as a cutter of wooden panels and in his own words "living for the weekend", he was persuaded to attend the BBC Clothes Show Live where he was scouted by a modelling agency after being convinced to do a catwalk by a friend.

Television
Kay was able to use his success in modelling to launch a television career with co-hosting roles on teen-targeted entertainment shows T4 on Channel 4 and The Mag on Channel 5. Following this, Kay presented the summer CBBC weekend morning show Fully Booked (called FBI, Fully Booked Interactive) in 2000, as well as TOTP+ Plus and TOTP@Play. In 2003 he co-hosted the Channel 4 game show Boys and Girls, which was cancelled after one series. The following year Kay hosted the third series of Celebrities Under Pressure on ITV.

From 2006, Kay presented primetime game show All Star Family Fortunes. In June 2015, it was announced that ITV was to rest the show until 2017, but it did not return. In 2007, he presented Vernon Kay's Gameshow Marathon, after replacing Ant & Dec, who hosted the first series.

From 2008 until 2009, Kay presented two series of Beat the Star, a programme for ITV. The first series averaged 4.05 million viewers and the second averaged 3.46 million.

On 17 April 2010, Kay began co-presenting a game show for ITV called The Whole 19 Yards with Caroline Flack which lasted for eight episodes and was made at Pinewood Studios. The series averaged 4.1 million viewers. In 2010, Kay was the co-host of Skating with the Stars, a six-part series which was broadcast in the United States.

In 2011, Kay was originally going to present ITV game show Sing If You Can with Stacey Solomon but, after filming the pilot episode, he felt that it would be better hosted by a comedian and was replaced by Keith Lemon.

In December 2011, Kay presented the Christmas Channel 4 show Home For the Holidays. In the summer of 2012, Kay presented ITV three episode mini-series Let's Get Gold, however the show received poor viewing figures and was axed.

In 2013 and 2014, Kay, Gabby Logan and Tom Daley co-presented the ITV diving show Splash! The programme was axed after two series.

In 2013, after Channel 4 regained the NFL rights from the BBC, Kay was announced as a presenter of The American Football Show, airing on Saturday mornings.

Since 2014, Kay has guest presented five episodes of The One Show. In 2015, Vernon began presenting daytime quiz show, 1000 Heartbeats for ITV. The show returned for a second run in November 2015. In 2016, Kay presented Drive, a five-part entertainment show for ITV. He made regular appearances in the second series of The Keith Lemon Sketch Show on ITV2.

In July 2017, Kay co-presented The Hero Challenge with Kirsty Gallacher on Sky Sports.

Kay hosted the non-broadcast pilot for a revival of Play Your Cards Right, a game show formerly hosted by Bruce Forsyth, but was not commissioned for a series. In September 2015, he hosted a pilot for a new ITV game show Home Win, made at Fountain Studios in Wembley.

In November 2017, it was announced that Kay would host Channel 5's coverage of the 2017–18 Formula E motor racing season. He co-presents the FIA's coverage of the 2018–19 season.

In November 2020, it was announced that Kay would be taking part in the twentieth series of I'm a Celebrity...Get Me Out of Here. Kay reached the final and finished in third place on 4 December 2020.

It was announced in March 2021 that Kay would host the British version of new gameshow Game of Talents. In March 2022, Kay was a last-minute replacement for Joel Dommett as co-host of Red Nose Day's The Great Comic Relief Prizeathon.

Radio
In January 2004, Kay joined BBC Radio 1 and presented an entertainment show every Sunday. In April 2004, he was given the 10am1pm weekend slot, which was previously hosted by Colin Murray and Edith Bowman and previously broadcast on both Saturdays and Sundays on the popular radio network. From October 2007 Dick and Dom took over Sunday mornings; Kay's show then ran between 10am to 1pm on Saturday. In 2008, he was one of a team of DJ's who filled in for Edith Bowman while she was on maternity leave along with Fearne Cotton and Nihal.

On 11 February 2009, it was announced that Kay would fill in for Chris Moyles while he climbed Mount Kilimanjaro for Comic Relief, an act he repeated on 13 July 2009 when Moyles took a day off. He also filled-in for Pete Tong's Essential Selection on Radio 1 on 10 April 2008. That same year, Kay filled in again for Chris Moyles from 10 August to 15 August when he was on holiday.  From 30 November 2009 Kay, again, covered for Chris Moyles on breakfast for a whole week as Moyles, Aled Haydn Jones and Fearne Cotton were away in Uganda handing out malaria nets and seeing how the money raised from the Mount Kilimanjaro climb for Comic Relief was being spent.

On 9 November 2012, it was announced that Kay would leave BBC Radio 1 to spend more time with his family. He presented his final show on 22 December and was replaced by Matt Edmondson.

After three years since his departure from Radio 1, Kay returned to radio on the newly launched Radio X network. In September 2015, Kay began presenting the weekday morning show from 10am to 1pm.
He left the station on Friday 17 March 2017.

Kay returned to BBC Radio after nine years away, to cover for Rylan Clark on his BBC Radio 2 show Rylan On Saturday on 6 and 13 February 2021 and again on the 12 and 26 June as well as 3 July. He stood in for Steve Wright on Steve Wright in the Afternoon on the week of the 24–28 May 2021. Kay stood in for Dermot O'Leary on 21 August 2021. He was scheduled to fill in for Wright again from 26 August to 1 September 2021 but only presented on the 26 and 27 August before he began isolating after testing positive for COVID-19 and was replaced by Gethin Jones. He sat in again from 13–15 October 2021 and from 25 November - 1 December 2021 whilst Wright had an illness. From March 2022, Kay became the regular cover for Zoe Ball on The Zoe Ball Breakfast Show.

On 24 February 2023, it was announced that Kay would begin presenting BBC Radio 2's mid-morning show from May.

Film
Kay has made a number of cameos, showing up in Shaun of the Dead (2004) and Keith Lemon: The Film (2012). He also made an uncredited appearance as a feasting hall guest in Hercules (2014).

Personal life
On 12 September 2003, Kay married Tess Daly at St Mary's Roman Catholic Church in Horwich, in Bolton. Together, they have two daughters, born in 2004 and 2009.

Kay received an honorary doctorate from the University of Bolton on 9 July 2009 for services to entertainment.

Kay is a passionate supporter of Bolton Wanderers F.C. He is also a fan of American football, joining the Manchester Allstars at the age of 13 and reuniting the team in 2011 for a one-off match against the Birmingham Lions. In 2011, he signed for the London Warriors, for whom he plays in the BAFANL Premier South division as a defensive back.

Kay enjoys flying model aircraft and drones.

Filmography
Television

Guest appearances

 It's Only TV...but I Like It (2002)
Shooting Stars (2002)
Bo' Selecta! (2003)
Davina (2006)
James Corden's World Cup Live (2010)
Celebrity Juice (2011, 2013, 2015)
Chris Moyles' Quiz Night (2011)
8 Out of 10 Cats (2011, 2012, 2013)
Alan Carr: Chatty Man (2011)
Would I Lie to You? (2013)
That Puppet Game Show (2013)
Room 101 (2014)
Through the Keyhole (2014, 2015)
Celebrity Squares (2014)
Sunday Brunch (2015)
 Go 8 Bit (2017)
 How to Spend it Well at Christmas with Phillip Schofield (2017)
 Celebrity Catchphrase (2023)

Radio
 

Film

References

External links
 Official Website
 Official Twitter page
 Official Facebook page
 
 Dance Sounds of the 90s with Vernon Kay (BBC Radio 2)

1974 births
Alumni of Manchester Metropolitan University
BBC Radio 1 presenters
BBC Radio 2 presenters
BBC Radio 5 Live presenters
English game show hosts
English Roman Catholics
English television presenters
English radio DJs
Living people
People associated with the University of Bolton
People from Bolton
I'm a Celebrity...Get Me Out of Here! (British TV series) participants